Dimensions is an album led by jazz trumpeter Maynard Ferguson featuring tracks recorded in early 1954 and mid-1955 and released on the EmArcy label.

Reception

Billboard in 1955 wrote: "Ferguson plays a cleaner, more purposeful host than has generally been true in the  past, in which ideas go volleying back and forth between him and saxophonist Bud Shank, Bob Cooper and Bob Gordon." AllMusic awarded the album 3 stars stating "Although not essential, the bop-oriented music is well-played and gives one a good taste of early Ferguson".

Track listing
 "Egad, Martha" (Bill Holman) - 3:50   
 "Breakfast Dance" (Holman) - 4:00   
 "Maiden Voyage" (Willie Maiden) - 2:56   
 "Thou Swell" (Richard Rodgers Lorenz Hart) - 2:50   
 "The Way You Look Tonight" (Dorothy Fields, Jerome Kern) - 2:50   
 "All God's Children Got Rhythm" (Bronislaw Kaper, Walter Jurmann, Gus Kahn) - 2:49   
 "Slow Stroll" (Holman) - 2:40   
 "Wonder Why" (Nicholas Brodzsky, Sammy Cahn) - 3:27   
 "Willie Nillie" (Maiden) - 2:41   
 "Hymm to Her" (Maiden) - 2:14   
 "Lonely Town" (Betty Comden, Adolph Green, Leonard Bernstein) - 2:56   
 "Somewhere Over the Rainbow" (Yip Harburg, Harold Arlen) - 3:00  
Recorded at Radio Recorders in Los Angeles on February 19, 1954 (tracks 3-6 & 9), and at Capitol Studios in Los Angeles on February 23, 1954 (tracks 10-12) and August 26, 1955 (tracks 1, 2, 7 & 8)

Personnel 
Maynard Ferguson - trumpet, valve trombone, bass trombone
Conte Candoli - trumpet (tracks 1, 2, 7 & 8)
Milt Bernhart (tracks 1, 2, 7 & 8), Herbie Harper (tracks 3-6 & 9-12) - trombone 
Herb Geller - alto saxophone (tracks 1, 2, 7 & 8)
Bud Shank - alto saxophone, flute (tracks 3-6 & 9-12) 
Bob Cooper (tracks 3-6 & 9-12), Nino Tempo (tracks 1, 2, 7, & 8) - tenor saxophone 
Bob Gordon - baritone saxophone
Ian Bernard (tracks 1, 2, 7 & 8), Russ Freeman (tracks 3-6 & 9-12) - piano 
Curtis Counce (Tracks 3-6 & 9-12), Red Mitchell (tracks 1, 2, 7 &8) - bass
Gary Frommer (tracks 1, 2, 7 & 8), Shelly Manne (tracks 3-6 & 9-12) - drums 
Bill Holman (tracks 1, 2, 7 & 8), Willie Maiden (tracks 3-6 & 9-12) - arranger

References 

1955 albums
Maynard Ferguson albums
EmArcy Records albums